The Myjava River is a river in western Slovakia and for a small part in the Czech Republic and left tributary of the Morava.

It rises in the White Carpathians near the village of Nová Lhota in Moravia, but crosses the Czech-Slovak border shortly afterwards and flows in a southern direction until the town of Myjava, where it enters the Myjava Hills and turns west. Near Sobotište it flows into the Záhorie Lowland and turns south until the village of Jablonica, turning northwest and from Senica it flows west, passing through Šaštín-Stráže and finally flowing into the Morava River near Kúty.

Etymology
The stem myj- comes from Proto-Slavic *myjǫ – to wash, to undermine river banks.

References

Rivers of Slovakia
Rivers of the South Moravian Region
International rivers of Europe